Sofia Sakalis (born 11 July 2002) is an Australian soccer player currently playing for Perth Glory in the A-League Women. She has represented Australia in the Australia U-17 and Australia U-20. Sakalis plays in the attacking midfielder position.

Early life
Sakalis, who is of Greek-Australian background, showed interest in soccer at the age of three and began playing two years later. When she first started playing, coaches assigned her to teams with boys her age but advanced her to play with older boys. At age 13, her performance at the National Championships earned her call-ups to three training camps with the Junior Matildas, Australia's under-17 national team.

Playing career

Club

Melbourne City, 2017–2021 
After training with Melbourne City FC in 2015–16, Sakalis signed with the team for the 2017–18 season at the age of 15. She made her debut for the club during the team's 5–2 win over the Newcastle Jets on 12 November.

Perth Glory, 2021–present 
Sofia signed a 2-year deal with Perth Glory ahead of the 2021–22 season.

International
Sakalis competed with the Junior Matildas at the 2017 AFC U-16 Women's Championship qualification tournament in Vietnam where they finished first in their group with an undefeated  record. During the team's first group match against Palestine, Sakalis scored five goals, and scored a total of 11 goals over 5 games. She was the top scorer at the qualifying tournament, helping Australia secure a place at the 2017 AFC U-16 Women's Championship in Thailand.

National Premier League
Sakalis was awarded Football Victoria's Gold Medal Award for the best player of 2022.

Honours
Sakalis was named 2016 Sport Stars of the Year with Olympic boxer Jason Whateley by the Whitehorse Leader.

References

External links
 Melbourne City player profile
 

Australian women's soccer players
Living people
Melbourne City FC (A-League Women) players
Perth Glory FC (A-League Women) players
A-League Women players
2002 births
Women's association football midfielders